The Federal Government of Brazil (Governo Federal) is the national government of the Federative Republic of Brazil, a republic in South America divided in 26 states and a federal district. The Brazilian federal government is divided in three branches: the executive, which is headed by the President and the cabinet; the legislative, whose powers are vested by the Constitution in the National Congress; and the judiciary, whose powers are vested in the Supreme Federal Court and lower federal courts. The seat of the federal government is located in Brasília.

Division of powers
Brazil is a federal presidential constitutional republic, which is based on a representative democracy. The federal government has three independent branches: executive, legislative, and judicial.

The Federal Constitution is the supreme law of Brazil. It is the foundation and source of the legal authority underlying the existence of Brazil and the federal government. It provides the framework for the organization of the Brazilian government and for the relationship of the federal government to the states, to citizens, and to all people within Brazil.

Executive power is exercised by the executive, headed by the President, advised by a Cabinet of Ministers. The President is both the head of state and the head of government. Legislative power is vested upon the National Congress, a two-chamber legislature comprising the Federal Senate and the Chamber of Deputies. Judicial power is exercised by the judiciary, consisting of the Supreme Federal Court, the Superior Court of Justice and other Superior Courts, the National Justice Council and the regional federal courts.

Executive branch

|President of the Republic
|Luiz Inácio Lula da Silva
|Worker's Party
|1 January 2023
|-
|Vice President of the Republic
|Geraldo Alckmin
|Brazilian Socialist Party
|1 January 2023
|}

Legislative branch

The bicameral National Congress (Congresso Nacional) consists of:

 The Federal Senate (Senado Federal), which has 81 seats — three members from each States and the Federal District, elected according to the principle of majority to serve eight-year terms. One-third are elected after a four-year period and two-thirds are elected after the next four-year period.
 The Chamber of Deputies (Câmara dos Deputados), which has 513 seats. Federal deputies are elected by proportional representation to serve four-year terms. The bicameral National Congress (Congresso Nacional) consists of:

There are no limits on the number of terms one may serve for either chamber. The seats are allotted proportionally to each state's population, but each state is eligible for a minimum of eight seats and a maximum of 70 seats. The result is a system weighted in favor of smaller states that are part of the Brazilian federation.

Currently, 15 political parties are represented in Congress. Since it is common for politicians to switch parties, the proportion of congressional seats held by particular parties changes regularly.  To avoid that, the Supreme Federal Court ruled in 2007 that the term belongs to the parties, and not to the representatives.

Judicial branch

Brazilian courts function under civil law adversarial system. The Judicial branch is organized in states' and federal systems with different jurisdictions.

The judges of the courts of the first instance take office after public competitive examination. The second instance judges are promoted among the first instance judges. The Justices of the superior courts are appointed by the President for life and approved by the Senate. All the judges and justices must be graduated in law. Brazilian judges must retire at the age of 70.

Federal judicial branch

The national territory is divided into five regions, which are composed of two or more states. Each region is divided into Judiciary Sections (Seções Judiciárias in Portuguese), coterminous with the territory of each state, and subdivided in Judiciary Subsections (Subseções Judiciárias), each with a territory that may not correspond to the states' comarcas.

The Judiciary subsections have federal courts of the first instance and each Region has a Federal Regional Tribunal (Tribunal Regional Federal) as a court of the second instance.

There are special federal court systems, in which such as Labour Court (Justiça do Trabalho) for labor or employment-related matters and disputes, Election Justice (Justiça Eleitoral) for electoral matters, and Military Justice (Justiça Militar) for martial criminal cases, each of them with its own courts.

Superior Courts

There are two national superior courts that grant writs of certiorari in civil and criminal cases: the Superior Justice Tribunal (Superior Tribunal de Justiça, STJ) and the federal supreme court, called the Supreme Federal Court.

The STJ grants a Special Appeal (Recurso Especial) when a judgment of a court of the second instance offends a federal statute disposition or when two or more second instance courts make different rulings on the same federal statute. There are parallel courts for labor law, electoral law and military law.

The STF grants Extraordinary Appeals (Recurso Extraordinário) when judgments of second instance courts violate the constitution. The STF is the last instance for the writ of habeas corpus and for reviews of judgments from the STJ.

The superior courts do not analyze any factual questions in their judgments, but only the application of the law and the constitution. Facts and evidence are judged by the courts of the second instance, except in specific cases such as writs of habeas corpus.

See also
 Politics of Brazil

External links